Joseph Vũ Duy Thống (July 2, 1952 – March 1, 2017) was a Vietnamese prelate, Bishop of the Roman Catholic Diocese of Phan Thiet from July 2009 to his death and the Head of the Episcopal Committee on Cultural Affairs. He was Auxiliary Bishop of the Roman Catholic Archdiocese of Ho Chi Minh City from 2001 to 2009.

Biography
Joseph Thống was born on July 2, 1952 in Thái Bình, North Vietnam. After moving to South Vietnam, he studied philosophy and theology at seminaries in Long Xuyen diocese and Saigon (now Ho Chi Minh City) archdiocese. He was ordained a priest on October 26, 1985 for the Archdiocese of Ho Chi Minh City. He then furthered his studies at the Institut Catholique de Paris and obtained a master's degree in theology in 1998. Later, he became professor at the St. Joseph Major Seminary of Ho Chi Minh City.

On July 4, 2001, he was appointed the Roman Catholic Auxiliary Bishop of Archdiocese of Ho Chi Minh City. On August 17, 2001, he was ordained a bishop by Jean-Baptiste Phạm Minh Mẫn at the Saigon Notre-Dame Basilica.

On July 25, 2009, he was named Bishop of Roman Catholic Diocese of Phan Thiet, and was installed on September 3, 2009.

On March 1, 2017, Thống died after a few days in a coma.

References

External links
 http://www.catholic-hierarchy.org/bishop/bvuduy.html
 http://cbcvietnam.org/Dioceses/phan-thiet-diocese.html
 http://gpphanthiet.com/uploads/news/2017_03/cao-pho-dc-giuse-web.pdf

1952 births
2017 deaths
21st-century Roman Catholic bishops in Vietnam
People from Thái Bình province